Events from 2022 in Hawaii.

Incumbents 

 Governor: David Ige

Events 
Ongoing – COVID-19 pandemic in Hawaii; Red Hill water crisis

 June 5 – Hawaii reports a probable case of monkeypox in a person from Oahu, becoming the first island region of the United States to report a case.
 November 8 – 
 2022 Hawaii House of Representatives election
 2022 Hawaii Senate election
 2022 Hawaii gubernatorial election
 2022 United States House of Representatives elections in Hawaii
 2022 United States Senate election in Hawaii

Deaths 

 January 23 – Ezra Kanoho, 94, American politician, member of the Hawaii House of Representatives (1987–2006)

References 

2022 in Hawaii
2020s in Hawaii
Years of the 21st century in Hawaii
Hawaii